Tim Webber is a Welsh visual effects supervisor. He is known for his work on Harry Potter and the Goblet of Fire (2005), The Dark Knight (2008), Avatar (2009), and Gravity (2013), for which he received an Academy Award for Best Visual Effects at the 86th Academy Awards.

Education

Webber was educated at St Catherine's College, Oxford, graduating in Physics in 1987.

Career
In 1988, Webber joined the British visual effects company Framestore, based near Oxford Street in London. He led the company's push into Digital Film and Television, developing Framestore’s virtual camera and motion rig systems. He has been the visual effects supervisor in some of the most technically and artistically challenging projects, including, Christopher Nolan's The Dark Knight (2008), James Cameron's Avatar (2009), and Louis Leterrier's Clash of the Titans (2010). He was Warner Brothers’ VFX supervisor on Alfonso Cuarón's space epic, Gravity (2013), with the techniques involved in the film realized by Webber and the Framestore team, taking three years to complete. David Heyman, co-producer of Gravity, hired Webber to oversee the film's visual effects work.

For his work on Gravity, he won both the BAFTA Award for Best Special Visual Effects at the 67th British Academy Film Awards, and an Academy Award for Best Visual Effects at the 86th Academy Awards.

In 2014, Webber was awarded the Royal Photographic Society Progress medal and Honorary Fellowship, which is awarded in recognition of any invention, research, publication or other contribution which has resulted in an important advance in the scientific or technological development of photography or imaging in the widest sense

Selected filmography
 Harry Potter and the Goblet of Fire (2005)
 The Dark Knight (2008)
 Avatar (2009)
 Gravity (2013)

References

External links

Special effects people
Living people
Best Visual Effects Academy Award winners
Best Visual Effects BAFTA Award winners
Welsh film people
Alumni of St Catherine's College, Oxford
Year of birth missing (living people)